List of champions of the 1891 U.S. National Championships (now known as the US Open). The men's tournament was held from 22 August to 31 August on the outdoor grass courts at the Newport Casino in Newport, Rhode Island. The women's tournament was held from 23 June to 27 June on the outdoor grass courts at the Philadelphia Cricket Club in Philadelphia, Pennsylvania. It was the 11th U.S. National Championships and the second Grand Slam tournament of the year.:

Finals

Men's singles

 Oliver Campbell defeated  Clarence Hobart  2–6, 7–5, 7–9, 6–1, 6–2

Women's singles

 Mabel Cahill defeated  Ellen Roosevelt  6–4, 6–1, 4–6, 6–3

Men's doubles
 Oliver Campbell /  Bob Huntington defeated  Valentine Hall /  Clarence Hobart 6–3, 6–4, 8–6

Women's doubles
 Mabel Cahill /  Emma Leavitt Morgan defeated  Grace Roosevelt /  Ellen Roosevelt 2–6, 8–6, 6–4

Mixed doubles
 Mabel Cahill / Wright defeated  Grace Roosevelt / Lee  6–4, 6–0, 7–5 †

† - The Mixed Doubles event was not an official event in 1891

References

External links
Official US Open website

 
U.S. National Championships
U.S. National Championships (tennis) by year
1891 in sports in Rhode Island
1891 in sports in Pennsylvania
June 1891 sports events
August 1891 sports events